Brigham Young High School was a private high school in Provo, Utah, United States, first known as Brigham Young Academy (BYA). The school later became attached to Brigham Young University (BYU) with its official name being Brigham Young University High School, and commonly called B Y High. It operated under the Church Educational System of the Church of Jesus Christ of Latter-day Saints (LDS Church).

History 
When BYA was founded in October 1875, it focused on elementary through high school education. It was intended that the independent school's curriculum would be in harmony with the teachings of the LDS Church, in contrast to the expanding state school system. Many of the early-day students were educated to become school teachers. In 1903, the institution was adjusted, with BYU and B Y High established as separate institutions. The high school closed in 1968 after 93 years. The main school building was renovated and now serves as the Provo City Library at Academy Square.

Notable alumni 
 Edward O. Anderson, architect for the LDS Church
 Brent F. Ashworth, historical documents collector
 Jae R. Ballif, BYU administrator
 R. Lanier Britsch, BYU professor of history
 Todd A. Britsch, BYU Vice President
 Kim S. Cameron, professor of business at the University of Michigan and Case Western Reserve University
 Orson Scott Card, popular science fiction novelist
 Benjamin Cluff, Principal of Brigham Young Academy
 James Smoot Coleman, professor in African Studies at UCLA
 Henry Aldous Dixon, Utah congressman and president of Weber College and Utah State Agricultural College
 Howard R. Driggs, author and professor at the University of Utah and New York University
 Philo T. Farnsworth, inventor, "father of television"
 Lynn Fausett, painter
 Harvey Fletcher, physicist and inventor of hearing loss audio technologies
 Robert H. Hinckley, car dealer, also involved with politics and aviation policy
 Milton R. Hunter, General Authority of the LDS Church
 Mickey Ibarra, Director of Intergovernmental Affairs in the Clinton administration
 Fred L. Markham, Utah architect
 Dallin H. Oaks, legal scholar and Apostle of the LDS Church
 Roger B. Porter, Harvard professor and presidential scholar
 O. Leslie Stone, General Authority of the LDS Church
 Blaine Yorgason, LDS novelist

References

External links 
 Brigham Young High School official alumni website
 Biographies of notable alumni

Brigham Young University
Former buildings and structures in Provo, Utah
Church Educational System
Defunct Christian schools
Defunct organizational subdivisions of the Church of Jesus Christ of Latter-day Saints
Defunct schools in Utah
Educational institutions disestablished in 1968
Latter Day Saint schools
Schools in Utah County, Utah
1903 establishments in Utah
1968 disestablishments in Utah